The 2021 Ole Miss Rebels baseball team represented the University of Mississippi in the 2021 NCAA Division I baseball season. The Rebels played their home games at Swayze Field.

Previous season

The Rebels finished 16–1. They won sixteen games in a row before the season was canceled due to the COVID-19 pandemic.

2020 MLB Draft

The Rebels had two players drafted in the five-round 2020 MLB draft.

Schedule and results

Schedule Source:

Roster

Record vs. conference opponents

2021 MLB draft

See also
2021 Ole Miss Rebels softball team

References

Ole Miss
Ole Miss Rebels baseball seasons
Ole Miss Rebels baseball
Ole Miss